Clara-Villerach is a commune in the Pyrénées-Orientales department in southern France.

Geography 
Clara-Villerach is located in the canton of Les Pyrénées catalanes and in the arrondissement of Prades.

Toponymy 
On February 7, 2017 the town's name changed from Clara to Clara-Villerach.

Population

See also
Communes of the Pyrénées-Orientales department

References

External links
 
 http://histoireduroussillon.free.fr/Villages/Histoire/Claira.php (in French)

Communes of Pyrénées-Orientales